Choreutis hyligenes is a moth in the family Choreutidae. It was described by Arthur Gardiner Butler in 1879. It is found in China, Taiwan, and Japan.

The larvae feed on Broussonetia kazinoki and Broussonetia kaempferi.

References

Arctiidae genus list at Butterflies and Moths of the World of the Natural History Museum

Choreutis
Moths described in 1879